Woodridge railway station is located on the Beenleigh line in Queensland, Australia. It serves the suburb of Woodridge in Logan City.

History
Woodridge station opened in 1913 as 15 Mile Siding as a goods station only. It was renamed Woodridge in January 1917 when the platform was made accessible to the public.

Services
Woodridge station is served by all stops Beenleigh line services from Beenleigh to Bowen Hills and Ferny Grove.

Services by platform

References

External links

Woodridge station Queensland's Railways on the Internet
[ Woodridge station] TransLink travel information

Railway stations in Logan City
Railway stations in Australia opened in 1913